Joshua Andrew Krajcik is an American singer-songwriter who currently resides in Columbus, Ohio. He began his career as a solo artist and later went on to form the Josh Krajcik Band with Corey Gillen and Mitch Pinkston. He was the runner-up in the first season of The X Factor USA in 2011.

Early life 
Josh was born in Wooster, Ohio to Lisa and Ron Krajcik. Josh has an older brother named Zack. He began taking piano lessons at an early age and has indicated that he had one piano teacher that taught him basic music theory as well as how to read music, while another piano teacher taught him how to play by ear. Josh was in junior high when he began playing guitar. He received his first guitar, a Fender Stratocaster, from his dad, Ron, when he was 12 years old. His father also plays guitar and the two have been known to often jam together.

Triway High School 
While Josh's hometown is Wooster, he did not attend Wooster City Schools. Josh attended nearby Triway Local Schools where he graduated from Triway High School in 1999. Josh was a member of the choir during his high school years and is still an ardent supporter of the arts in education, specifically the Triway Local Schools Music Boosters.

Performing career

Early years 
Some media outlets have reported that Josh began performing in front of live audiences during his teenage years. Josh himself admits to lying about his age in order to get early gigs at bars around Wayne County, Ohio. His first gig was at a bar near Lodi, Ohio, called The Shady Glen. Despite being only 16 at the time, Josh convinced the owners he was 22 and received $100 for the gig. After high school, Josh fronted a number of bands and projects while living in the Wooster, Ohio, area. Unreleased tracks are in limited circulation from Josh's time with "Etherface " and Love Lies Bleeding.

He has played various venues in Ohio, including in Columbus, Cleveland, Cincinnati, Akron, Bowling Green, Wooster and others.

Josh Krajcik Band 
After years of performing solo and in bands, Josh was introduced to bass player Mitch Pinkston in Bowling Green, Ohio. Once Mitch graduated from Bowling Green State University, he moved to Columbus. Josh would visit and play acoustic shows with Mitch. In 2005, Josh booked a full band show at a venue called The Blues Station (now The Garage Bar) without having a drummer for the band. Josh asked the sound engineer at the club, Eric French, if he knew anybody that could sit in and play drums for the show. Eric introduced Josh to local drummer Corey Gillen, and the three would continue performing together as Josh Krajcik Band through 2011, with rhythm guitar player, Eric French, added to the band in early 2011.

After the formation of Josh Krajcik Band, Josh promptly recorded the band's first record "Ghosts" (2005) with Joe Viers at Schwab Studios in Columbus, Ohio. Shortly after, the band went on tour to support Hollywood Records artist, and fellow Ohio native, Gran Bel Fisher. On tour they opened for such prestigious artists as: Corinne Bailey Rae, Brandi Carlile, and The Fray. After performing at Bonnaroo in 2006, they appeared on ABC's Jimmy Kimmel Live! and NPR's renowned World Cafe in 2007.

Upon their return to Ohio, Josh Krajcik Band continued building its fan-base in the mid-west by playing live shows in Columbus (Comfest), Wooster (Javapalooza, WoosterFest), Cleveland (Brother's Lounge), Cincinnati (Mt Adams Music Festival), Toledo, Newport (Southgate House), and Nashville (The Billy Block Show). They also began working on songs for their second record, "Atavistic." Looking to build upon the feel and mood of "Ghosts," they again worked with co-producer/engineer Joe Viers, this time at Sonic Lounge Studios in Grove City, Ohio. A release party was held for "Atavistic" on February 11, 2011, at Victory's in the Columbus, Ohio, Brewery District.

Discography 
 Ghosts (2005)
 The Push
 Way of the World
 I Knew You Once
 Easily Lost Easily One
 The Pull
 The Harrowing
 Faces
 Obtenebration
 Rooftop 39
 Wide Awake
 Nearing Neptune
 Atavistic (2011)
 Pariah
 Suzzane
 Shorn
 As Long As It Takes
 Lunatic
 Tempest
 Crawl Out
 Statue
 Low
 Elephant
 Harlot
 Atavistic
Josh Krajcik (2012)
 Nothing
 One Thing She'll Never Know
 Don't Make Me Hopeful
 Let Me Hold You
Blindly, Lonely, Lovely (2013)
 Nothing
 Back Where We Belong
 No Better Lovers
 The Remedy
 Close Your Eyes
 When You Go
 Don't Make Me Hopeful
 One Thing She'll Never Know
 Her Song
 Let Me Hold You
 Lost at Sea (iTunes Bonus Track)
Oblivion (2017)
 Goodbye
 Let's Disappear
 Oblivion
 All That's Left of Me
 Don't Save Me
 Never Wanted

The X Factor 
Josh auditioned for the first season in Chicago, Illinois of Simon Cowell's The X Factor USA in front of Cowell, Paula Abdul, Cheryl Cole and L.A. Reid. Josh performed "At Last" at his audition. The video of his audition has been viewed over 15 million times on YouTube. He went on to become one of the Top 32 and performed in the Judges Houses round "The First Time Ever I Saw Your Face" in front of special guest Enrique Iglesias and mentor Nicole Scherzinger (who replaced Cole). From there, he moved on to become one of the finalists (Final 16), qualifying for the live shows in the Over-30s category mentored by Scherzinger. During the live shows, he gave the following performances:

Performances and results

After The X Factor
After finishing The X Factor, Josh began working on his album and touring regionally in the midwest.  Recording for the album took place between Los Angeles and London.   Throughout the recording process Josh worked with producers Eg White, Steve Robson, Steve Kipner, Andrew Frampton, and more. He continued to play sold-out shows throughout the midwest while the album was mixed and mastered.

On November 29, 2012, Krajcik performed as a guest artist on The X Factor.  He performed his song "One Thing She'll Never Know" and released a 4-song EP on iTunes, titled Josh Krajcik EP, that same night. In recent interviews Josh has stated that he will continue to tour and release a full-length album in Spring 2013. On February 8, Krajcik confirmed the release of his first album Blindly, Lonely, Lovely, it was released April 2, 2013.

Josh released his first solo independent album - Oblivion - on May 18, 2017. Co-written and co-produced with Bill Patterson (The Wet Darlings) the six song EP "traded in horn sections and other big-budget production flourishes (of Blindly, Lonely, Lovely) for an up-close, personal sound".

In December 2018 Krajcik released a cover of the Etta James song that won him a spot on The X Factor - At Last.

References

External links
Official Josh Krajcik website
The official site of THE X FACTOR USA

Year of birth missing (living people)
The X Factor (American TV series) contestants
Living people
American people of Slovak descent
21st-century American singers
20th-century American singers
20th-century American male singers
21st-century American male singers